Progressive Conservative Party prominently refers to a group of Canadian political parties that are distinct and on the centre-right of the political spectrum:

National
Progressive Conservative Party of Canada, merged into the modern-day Conservative Party of Canada in 2003

Provincial and territorial
Progressive Conservative Association of Alberta, merged with the United Conservative Party in 2017
Progressive Conservative Association of Nova Scotia
Progressive Conservative Party of Manitoba
Progressive Conservative Party of New Brunswick
Progressive Conservative Party of Newfoundland and Labrador
Progressive Conservative Party of Ontario
Progressive Conservative Party of Quebec
Progressive Conservative Party of Saskatchewan
British Columbia Conservative Party, formerly the British Columbia Progressive Conservative Party
Northwest Territories Liberal-Conservative Party (1897–1905)
Prince Edward Island Progressive Conservative Party
Yukon Party, formerly the Yukon Progressive Conservative Party

Other countries
Progressive Conservative Party (Australia)
Progressive Conservative Party (Romania)

See also
Conservative Party (disambiguation)
Progressive Conservative (disambiguation)
Progressive Party (disambiguation)
Progressive Party of Canada
Progressive Party of Manitoba
Progressive Party of Saskatchewan
PC Party (disambiguation)
Red Tory, a person with progressive conservative leanings